Trash Art! is an independent record label from Providence, Rhode Island, specializing in loud music from punk and metal subgenres. The label was founded in 1997, and has issued releases on vinyl and compact disc formats by 16, Apartment 213, As The Sun Sets, Backstabbers Inc, Cursed, Disappearer, Forensics, Meltdown, Today Is The Day, Trap Them, Verse, and XFilesX, amongst others.

Current bands
Backstabbers Incorporated
Cursed
Disappearer
Forensics
Meltdown
Trap Them
XFilesX

Previous/one-off bands
16
Another Dead Juliet
Apartment 213
As The Sun Sets
Dahmer
Draw Blood
Paindriver
Today Is The Day
Verse

See also
 List of record labels

External links
Trash Art!
Myspace

Record labels established in 1997
American independent record labels